Barnabé is both a surname and a given name. Notable people with the name include:

Persons
Arrigo Barnabé (born 1951), Brazilian musician and an actor
Barnabé Brisson (1531–1591), French jurist and politician
Barnabé Brisson (engineer) (1777–1828)
Barnabe (artist) French artist

Arts and entertainment
 Barnabé (film), a 1938 French comedy film

See also
Barnabe (disambiguation)
Barnaby (disambiguation)
Saint-Barnabé